Bui Huu Hung (born 1957) is a Vietnamese artist who works primarily with lacquer.

Hung was born in Vietnam’s northern capital city Hanoi in 1957. His Nha San studio and residence are still there in the city’s West Lake suburb. Since the age of 18 Hung has been fascinated with lacquer. As a teenager he traveled to small villages where the ancient techniques were still being used in an attempt to preserve the age-old art form. Following a stint of combat duty in 1978, he attended the Indochina Fine Arts University where he continued his study of traditional lacquer art. Hung has been a member of the Vietnam Artists Association since 1986 and the International Lacquer Artists Association since 1996.

Hung’s creations use a combination of materials: acrylics, lacquer, and sculpt, but he is most famous for his lacquer portraits. Hung is unique as an artist in that his work was exposed internationally before the formal opening of the Vietnamese economy in the 1990s. In 1982 his lacquer landscapes were exhibited in Vacsava, Poland, and in 1983 his still lifes were seen in Sofia, Bulgaria.  Hung participated in a group exhibition titled Art Spring hosted by Alliance Francis, in Hanoi in 1993.  The following year he established the Avante Guarde group with its first exhibition in Hanoi together with artists Trương Tân, Lê Hồng Thái, and Đỗ Minh Tâm—with support from the German Socialist Cultural Mission. This very successful exhibition celebrating Vietnam’s opening (Đổi Mới) generated serious attention from the local art community and art lovers in neighbouring countries.

In 1996 Hung’s participation at the International Lacquer Exhibition, at the Fuitijia Museum, Tokyo marked his membership in the World Lacquer Artists Association (along with artist Lê Hồng Thái).

In 1997 Hung represented Vietnamese modern doi moi artists Mr Nguyễn Tư Nghiêm, Central Vietnam artists, Mr Nguyễn Chung and southern artists (prior to 1945) showing their works at the Sacred Seasons Exhibition in the Four Seasons Hotel Gallery (sponsored by the Notices Gallery of the Singapore Hilton).

Since his first solo exhibition in 1995 at Hanoi’s Australian Cultural Center, Hung has gone on to represent the spirit of newly emerging Vietnamese artists with innumerable solo exhibitions worldwide, including London, Hong Kong, Miami, Paris, Singapore, and Dubai.

References

External links
 STUDIO AT MARLY-LE-ROI, PARIS

Living people
1957 births
People from Hanoi
20th-century Vietnamese painters
21st-century Vietnamese painters